A wide-column store (or extensible record store) is a type of NoSQL database. It uses tables, rows, and columns, but unlike a relational database, the names and format of the columns can vary from row to row in the same table. A wide-column store can be interpreted as a two-dimensional key–value store.

Wide-column stores versus columnar databases
Wide-column stores such as Bigtable and Apache Cassandra are not column stores in the original sense of the term, since their two-level structures do not use a columnar data layout. In genuine column stores, a columnar data layout is adopted such that each column is stored separately on disk. Wide-column stores do often support the notion of column families that are stored separately. However, each such column family typically contains multiple columns that are used together, similar to traditional relational database tables. Within a given column family, all data is stored in a row-by-row fashion, such that the columns for a given row are stored together, rather than each column being stored separately. 

Wide-column stores that support column families are also known as column family databases.

History
Google's Bigtable is one of the prototypical examples of a wide-column store.

Notable wide-column stores

Notable wide-column stores  include:
 Apache Accumulo
 Apache Cassandra
 Apache HBase
 Bigtable
 DataStax Enterprise (uses Apache Cassandra)
 DataStax Astra DB (uses Apache Cassandra)
 Hypertable
 Azure Tables
 Scylla (database)

References 

NoSQL
Databases